These are the UK Rock & Metal Singles Chart number one hits of 1987. The chart was compiled by MRIB who were a direct rival competitor to Gallup who compiled the "official" charts that were later produced by the Chart Information Network, before being renamed the Official Charts Company. However, the Official Charts Company did not start producing the UK Rock & Metal charts until 1994.

See also
List of UK Dance Singles Chart number ones of 1987
List of UK Independent Singles Chart number ones of the 1980s

References

1987
1987 in British music